The Saint Anthony and Saint Stephen Icons Icons were created by Florentine painter and sculptor Bicci di Lorenzo, son of Florentine painter Neri di Bicci, between 1400 and 1450 in the city of Florence. It is tempura and gilded on a poplar panel, a medium he used during that time period for many of his religious paintings including the painting of Saint John the Baptist and Saint Miniato. The rocks on the head of Saint Stephen signifies his martyrdom for being stoned to death by a Jewish assembly; he criticized Jewish teachings.

It is displayed at the Legion of Honor Museum in San Francisco, California.

References

Italian paintings
Paintings in the collection of the Fine Arts Museums of San Francisco